Rebecca 'Bec' Woods (born 1984) is an Australian professional surfer from Copacabana, New South Wales, Australia.

The 2013 season would be Woods's ninth consecutive year on the Women's ASP World Tour.

Woods won the Australian Junior Surfing Title in 2002 at age 16, then went on to become the World Junior Surfing Champion in 2004 at age 18. She debuted on the elite Women's ASP World Championship Tour in 2005 at age 19.

External links
Bec Wood's Personal Athlete Website

Living people
1984 births
Australian female surfers
People from New South Wales
World Surf League surfers